Canary Islands Now (Spanish: Ahora Canarias) is a left-wing and Canarian separatist electoral alliance founded in February 2019 in order to compete in the 2019 Spanish general election and the Canarian regional election of that same year. The alliance is formed by three parties: Canarian Nationalist Alternative (Spanish: Alternativa Nacionalista Canaria, ANC), National Congress of the Canaries (Spanish: Congreso Nacional de las Canarias; CNC) and the Unity of the People (Spanish: Unidad del Pueblo, UP).

The parties involved in Ahora Canarias are also part of the Ahora Repúblicas alliance formed for the 2019 European Parliament election.  Ahora Repúblicas is formed from progressive, left-wing nationalist and independentist parties from Catalonia, the Basque Country, Galicia, Asturias, Aragon and the Canary Islands.

Election results

References 

Ahora Repúblicas
Canarian nationalist parties
Regionalist parties in Spain
Nationalist parties in Spain
Republican parties in Spain
2019 establishments in Spain
Political parties established in 2019
Socialist parties in Spain
Left-wing nationalist parties